Evenk Autonomous Okrug (or Evenkia) was a federal subject of Russia.  On January 1, 2007, it was merged into Krasnoyarsk krai.

Oleg Chapogir from Kislokan is regarded as the most renowned composer from Evenkia.  He has devoted himself to local music and poetry (such as by Nikolai Oyogir and Alitet Nemtushkin), though he was educated at Norilsk Musical College and was part of that school's first class, which graduated in 1974.

Though not a native of Evenkia, Nikolai Nikolaevich has also had a profound effect on Evenk music.  He funded the children's national band Osikta and an influential brass band.  Nikolaevich has also arranged local folklore and worked with Chapogir, Evgeniya Kureiskaya, a popular Evenk singer, and Anatoli Kustov, a composer.

Links 
http://www.evenkiya.ru/sound/sound.html 

Culture of Krasnoyarsk Krai
Evenk Autonomous Okrug
Arctic music
Indigenous music